Juan Enrique Airport ,  is an airport  west-southwest of Paine, a city in the Santiago Metropolitan Region of Chile.

The airport is on an alluvial slope running north from mountain peaks to the south. Mountainous ridges run from the south to both east and west of the runway.

See also

Transport in Chile
List of airports in Chile

References

External links
OpenStreetMap - Juan Enrique
OurAirports - Juan Enrique
SkyVector - Juan Enrique

Airports in Santiago Metropolitan Region